Lumbrineridae is a family of polychaetes belonging to the order Eunicida.

Genera

Genera:
 Abyssoninoe Orensanz, 1990
 Aotearia Benham, 1927
 Augeneria Monro, 1930

References

Polychaetes
Annelid families